Orizari Glacier is the  long and  wide glacier in Veregava Ridge on the east side of Sentinel Range in Ellsworth Mountains, Antarctica.  It is draining the north slopes of Mount Waldron, and flowing north-northwestwards to join Dater Glacier west of Sipey Bluff.

The feature is named after the settlements of Orizari in southern Bulgaria.

Location
US mapping in 1988.

See also
 List of glaciers in the Antarctic
 Glaciology

Maps
 Vinson Massif.  Scale 1:250 000 topographic map.  Reston, Virginia: US Geological Survey, 1988.
 Antarctic Digital Database (ADD). Scale 1:250000 topographic map of Antarctica. Scientific Committee on Antarctic Research (SCAR). Since 1993, regularly updated.

References
 Orizari Glacier SCAR Composite Antarctic Gazetteer
 Bulgarian Antarctic Gazetteer. Antarctic Place-names Commission. (details in Bulgarian, basic data in English)

External links
 Orizari Glacier. Copernix satellite image

Glaciers of Ellsworth Land
Bulgaria and the Antarctic